John Ajina Sesay is a Sierra Leonean football coach who became manager of the national team in October 2014.

He played as a midfielder for Old Edwardians F.C. Sesay was manager of East End Lions and won the league title in 2009. He was also manager at Freetown City F.C.

References

1960s births
Living people
Sierra Leonean footballers
Sierra Leone international footballers
Sierra Leonean football managers
Sierra Leone national football team managers
Association footballers not categorized by position